Laureano Albán Rivas (born January 9, 1942) is a Costa Rican writer.  A native of Turrialba, he was a recipient of the Magón National Prize for Culture in 2006.  He served as representative of the Republic of Costa Rica to UNESCO from 1998–2002.

Awards
Adonais Prize for poetry, Madrid, Spain, 1979.
National Poetry Prize Achilles J. Echeverria, San Jose, Costa Rica, 1980.
First Prize of Spanish Culture, Madrid, Spain, 1981.
Spanish American Literature Award, Huelva, Spain, 1982.
Religious International Poetry Prize, Burgos, Spain, 1983.
Single Award VII Biennial of Poetry, León, Spain, 1983.
Columbia University Translation Award center, New York, USA. UU., 1983.
Prize Walt Whitman Poetry Central, Central, 1986.
World Prize for Mystical Poetry Rielo Fernando, Madrid, Spain, 1989.
National Poetry Prize Achilles J. Echeverria, San Jose, Costa Rica, 1993.
Mago National Culture Award, San José, Costa Rica, 2006.

References

1942 births
Living people
Costa Rican male writers
People from Cartago Province